David de Burgh Graham (born July 29, 1981) is a Canadian politician and railway dispatcher who served as the Member of Parliament (MP) for the riding of Laurentides—Labelle from 2015 until his defeat in the 2019 federal election. A member of the Liberal Party of Canada, he is also an important player in the free software movement.

Early life
Graham was born on July 29, 1981, and grew up in the Laurentides region. His great-grandfather was Hirsch Wolofsky, the founder of Keneder Adler (Canadian Eagle), a Yiddish-language newspaper in Montreal. He is the great-great-nephew of Leon Crestohl, who served as the MP for Cartier from 1950 until his death in 1963. Judaism played an important part in his life. Graham attended Hebrew School as a child, and now considers himself a Reconstructionist Jew.

Free Software Movement 
At 18 years of age, Graham was an editor for the web sites of the FLOSS community DevChannel.org, freshmeat.net and later the news sites Newsforge.com and Linux.com controlled by the predecessors of Geeknet. He is co-founder of the Open and Free Technology Community in late 2001 when OpenProjects.net split into OFTC and Freenode where he was elected to four terms as president,
and remains as honorary adviser. In 2002, OFTC joined Software in the Public Interest and Graham was elected to the Board of Directors in January 2004.

Trainspotter 
Graham is a noted railfan, whose photos have appeared in several publications.
He is recognized as an expert in rail transportation and public transit and the Guelph Mercury newspaper named him among the "Top 40 Under 40" for his work in public transit.

Political career 
Prior to his election, Graham worked as a political assistant for Liberal MP Scott Simms. In October 2015, he was elected to Parliament for the riding of Laurentides—Labelle.

As an MP, Graham was quick to start talking about Open Source Software in an official capacity. As a long-time Linux user, Graham was able to advocate for use of free software in government.

Serving a rural riding, it was particularly important for Graham to promote High-Speed Internet. Graham is very aware of the importance of high-speed internet in supporting any digital first agenda for this country. Graham has been a leader in promoting Rural Digital Infrastructure, including basic cell phone access which is missing from much of Canada. He has also promoted co-operatives as a viable solution for rural broadband.

Graham was the first MP to use several references in Canada's Hansard including grok, linux, and Electronic Frontier Foundation.

As a science fiction fan Graham was the first to talk about Arthur Dent and The Hitchhiker's Guide to the Galaxy in the House of Commons. He also demonstrated a sense of humour with an April Fools joke discussing the petition to sell Montana to Canada for $1 trillion.

Electoral record

External links
 Liberal Party of Canada profile
 
 House of Commons profile
 Open Parliament profile

References 

Liberal Party of Canada MPs
Living people
People from Sainte-Agathe-des-Monts
Members of the House of Commons of Canada from Quebec
Jewish Canadian politicians
Canadian Sephardi Jews
Canadian Reconstructionist Jews
1981 births
21st-century Canadian politicians